The McNeese Cowgirls basketball team is the women's basketball team that represents McNeese State University in Lake Charles, Louisiana. The team competes in the Southland Conference and plays its home games at The Legacy Center. The Cowgirls are coached by Lynn Kennedy.

NCAA tournament results

References

External links